Vexillum caelatum is a species of small sea snail, marine gastropod mollusk in the family Costellariidae, the ribbed miters.

Description
The length of the shell attains 16.1 mm.

The color of the shell is yellowish or chestnut-brown, with an indistinct lighter band.

Distribution
This marine species occurs off the Philippines, Mozambique and American Samoa.

References

External links
 Reeve, L. A. (1844-1845). Monograph of the genus Mitra. In: Conchologia Iconica, or, illustrations of the shells of molluscous animals, vol. 2, pl. 1-39 and unpaginated text. L. Reeve & Co., London.

caelatum
Gastropods described in 1845